Pichai Pituvong is a Thai football coach. He managed Thailand Premier League side BEC Tero Sasana FC in the 2001–02 Premier League season, taking over from Englishman Jason Withe, who had just led the club to the domestic double, the league and cup. Pichai himself led the club to the league title. He duly left the following season being replaced by Attaphol Puspakom.

In August 2009, he replaced the Brazilian coach, Carlos Ferreira at Chula United. After retiring from coaching works, he became a columnist.

Teams managed

BEC Tero Sasana: 2001–02
Chula United: 2009

Honours

Thailand Premier League Winner: 2001-02

References

Pichai Pituwong
Living people
Pichai Pituwong
1956 births